Haengdang Station is a station on the Seoul Subway Line 5 in Seongdong-gu, Seoul.

Station layout

References 

Railway stations opened in 1996
Seoul Metropolitan Subway stations
Metro stations in Seongdong District